Southwest University Station is a station on Line 6 of Chongqing Rail Transit in Chongqing municipality, China, which is located in Beibei District, adjacent to the Southwest University. It opened in 2014.

The former name of this station is Tiansheng (Chinese: 天生), which has been replaced in 2019.

Station structure

References

Railway stations in Chongqing
Railway stations in China opened in 2014
Chongqing Rail Transit stations